Fellows of the Royal Society elected in 1936.

Fellows

Alexander Craig Aitken
Sir John Douglas Cockcroft
Herbert John Fleure
Sir Clive Forster-Cooper
Sir Alexander Gibb
Sir Henry Lewis Guy
Henry George Albert Hickling
Lancelot Thomas Hogben
Joseph Kenyon
Edgar Hartley Kettle
Sir Nevill Francis Mott
Ronald George Wreyford Norrish
Harry Hemley Plaskett
Ernest Frederick Relf
Francis John Worsley Roughton
Birbal Sahni
Ernest Basil Verney

Foreign members

Sigmund Freud
Ludwig Jost
Felix Andries Vening Meinesz
Hermann Weyl

Statute 12
 Sir Thomas Hudson Middleton

References

1936
1936 in science
1936 in the United Kingdom